Gogana ossicolor is a moth in the family Drepanidae first described by Warren in 1922. It is found on Borneo.

References

Moths described in 1922
Drepaninae